The 1930 Municipal election was held on December 1, 1930.  Peter Fenton was elected Mayor of the City of Sudbury.

The candidates elected to Sudbury City Council were:

1930 Election results

The results of the Mayoral and Aldermanic contests as reported by the Sudbury Star on December 3, 1930, are as follows:

References

1930
1930 elections in Canada
1930 in Ontario